P. Mahalingam is an Indian politician and incumbent Member of the Tamil Nadu Legislative Assembly from the Kilvelur constituency. He represents the Communist Party of India (Marxist) party.

Electoral performance

References 

Communist Party of India (Marxist) politicians from Tamil Nadu
Living people
Year of birth missing (living people)
Tamil Nadu MLAs 2011–2016
Tamil Nadu MLAs 2021–2026